The 182nd Massachusetts General Court, consisting of the Massachusetts Senate and the Massachusetts House of Representatives, met in 2001 and 2002 during the governorships of Paul Cellucci and Jane Swift. Tom Birmingham served as president of the Senate and Thomas Finneran served as speaker of the House.

Senators

Representatives

See also
 107th United States Congress
 List of Massachusetts General Courts

References

Further reading

External links
 
 
 
 
 
 

Political history of Massachusetts
Massachusetts legislative sessions
massachusetts
2001 in Massachusetts
massachusetts
2002 in Massachusetts